A private natural heritage reserve ( – RPPN) is a type of preservation area in Brazil. 
The land is owned privately and may be used for research, education, eco-tourism and recreation.
However, this use must be compatible with the goals of preserving the environment and maintaining biodiversity.
Although the private reserves have been criticized, they are a valuable complement to publicly owned reserves.

History

The concept of a private natural heritage reserve (RPPN) has its origin in the "Protective forest" defined in the Forest Code of 1934, an inalienable tax-exempt area that remained the property of its owner. The term was dropped from the Forest Code of 1965, and the tax exemptions dropped the next year. 
However, the Hunting Code of 1967 gave property owners the ability to prevent hunting on their property.
In 1977 the legal entity of a "Private Refuge for Native Animals" was introduced, in which hunting would be banned.
This was replaced ten years later by "Private Fauna and Flora Reserve" to cover protection of flora and marine fauna in addition to wild animals.
In 1990 the new name "Private Natural Heritage Reserve" was adopted with new rules, including the possibility of recognition of RPPN's by state environmental agencies, a more democratic and perhaps less bureaucratic process.
Finally, the concept of the RPPN was spelled out in Law No. 9.985 of 18 July 2000, which established the National System of Conservation Units (SNUC).

As of September 2009 there were 532 federally-recognized RPPN's covering .
Various regional associations provide technical support to RPPN owners.

Definition

A private natural heritage reserve is a sustainable use conservation unit under SNUC.
Such units allow sustained use of renewable environmental resources, maintaining biodiversity and other ecological attributes.
The reserves are established in private areas in perpetuity to preserve biodiversity.
The owner is given incentives such as tax exemption.
The SNUC specifies that sustainable use of the renewable environmental resources must be compatible with the essential ecological processes, maintaining biodiversity and ecological attributes.
Sustainable use in this case includes scientific research and public visits for tourism, recreation and education.

Value

RPPN's have been criticized for failing to conform to an overall plan for conservation at a national or regional level, for being dependent on the will of the owners, for being too small to have any effect in such a huge country and for lack of monitoring of RPPN management or effectiveness.
On the other hand, RPPN's may have value due to their independence of political forces and their creation of additional protected areas on private land that may provide landscape connectivity, wildlife corridors and buffer zones around the other protected areas.
Private and public agencies can help protect, manage and monitor an RPPN. 
And an RPPN, which is created without expropriations and gives value to the owner, may create less conflict than publicly owned units and more community involvement and awareness of the value of environmental conservation, restoration and research.

Examples

References

Sources

Types of protected area of Brazil